Mark Watson is an American sculptor who was born in Honolulu, Hawaii in 1949.  His father Charles W. Watson is also a Hawaii-based sculptor.  Watson's sculptures in public places include:
 Mai Ka Mea Hana Ka Ike (From Tools, Comes Knowledge), 1988, Kapiolani Community College Honolulu, Hawaii
 Na Alii, 1992, Lahaina Intermediate School, Lahaina, Hawaii
 Hookahi (To Make as One), 2001, President Theodore Roosevelt High School, Honolulu, Hawaii

References
 Hawaii Artreach, “Art in Public Places”, Vol. 15, Nos. 3 & 4, Winter 2001, p. 13.
 Mark Watson in the Art Inventories Catalog of the Smithsonian American Art Museum

Footnotes

Living people
1949 births
Sculptors from Hawaii